The Northern Ireland Law Commission was a Law Commission in Northern Ireland created under section 50 of the Justice (Northern Ireland) Act 2002, implementing recommendations following the Good Friday Agreement. It replaced the non-statutory Law Reform Advisory Committee. The Commission has been "non-operational" since April 2015.

The Northern Ireland Law Commission kept the law of Northern Ireland under review, with a view to law reform. It had five members, a part-time chairman and four full-time commissioners, appointed by the Secretary of State for Northern Ireland. The chairman was a judge of the High Court of Northern Ireland, who retained judicial office.  The other commissioners were a barrister, a solicitor, a legal academic, and a layperson.

References

External links

Section 50 of the Justice (Northern Ireland) Act 2002

Law of Northern Ireland
Government of Northern Ireland
Law commissions
Law reform in the United Kingdom